This article contains the results of the 1979 Iranian Constitutional Assembly election.

Multi-seat constituencies

Tehran (10)

Khorasan (7)

East Azerbaijan (6)

Mazandaran (5)

Khuzestan (4)

Fars (4)

Isfahan (4)

Gilan (3)

West Azerbaijan (3)

Markazi (2)

Kerman (2)

Kermanshahan (2)

Hamedan (2)

Zanjan (2)

Lorestan (2)

Kordestan (2)

Sistan and Baluchestan (2)

Single-seat constituencies

Semnan

Bushehr

Ilam

Yazd

Hormozgan

Chaharmahal & Bakhtiari

Kohgiluyeh & Boyer-Ahmad

Armenian community

Zoroastrian community

Jewish community

Assyrian community 

Election results in Iran